The Sherman Bates House is a historic house at the northeast corner of Echo Lane and United States Route 63 in Hardy, Arkansas.  It is a -story fieldstone structure with vernacular Tudor Revival styling.  Its prominent features include a fieldstone chimney on the right side of the main facade, and a projecting stone porch on the left.  The corners of the chimney and porch are fitted with carefully cut stones.  The house was built in 1940 by Sherman Bates, owner of a local bulk fuel oil business.  Bates owned the house until he enlisted in World War II; the house's subsequent owners were also prominent local businessmen.

The house was listed on the National Register of Historic Places in 1998.  A second house built by Bates, in 1947 after his war service, is listed as the Sherman and Merlene Bates House.

See also
National Register of Historic Places listings in Sharp County, Arkansas

References

Houses on the National Register of Historic Places in Arkansas
Tudor Revival architecture in Arkansas
Houses completed in 1940
Houses in Sharp County, Arkansas
1940 establishments in Arkansas
National Register of Historic Places in Sharp County, Arkansas